Rot Front (German: Red Front) may refer to:

 Rot Front (confectionery brand), a confectionery factory in Russia
 Rot-Front, a German village in Kyrgyzstan
 RotFront, a German world music band
 Antonov RF-8 Rot Front, one version of a Soviet glider developed by Oleg Antonov
 Rotfrontkämpferbund (Red Front Fighters' League), a German paramilitary organization
 Die Rote Front, the newspaper of Rotfrontkämpferbund
 Russian United Labour Front (ROT Front), a communist party in Russia

See also
Red Front (disambiguation)